Urianus was a legendary king of the Britons as accounted by Geoffrey of Monmouth.  He was the son of King Andragius and was succeeded by Eliud. Geoffrey may possibly have based the character on that of Urien Rheged (6th century), although there is no resemblance between them.

References

Legendary British kings
2nd-century BC legendary rulers